American rapper Megan Thee Stallion has received various accolades throughout her career. She rose to prominence in 2019 with her mixtape Fever, which won the award for Best Mixtape at the 2019 BET Hip Hop Awards, and was later nominated for Album of the Year at the 2020 BET Awards. Her singles "Cash Shit" and "Hot Girl Summer" garnered her several nominations, with the former nominated at the 2019 Soul Train Music Awards and the 2020 NME Awards, and the latter earning her an MTV Video Music Award.

In 2020, her breakthrough single "Savage (Remix)" was nominated for three Grammy Awards and three MTV Video Music Awards. She also featured on Cardi B's song "WAP", winning at the American Music Awards and nominated at the MTV Europe Music Awards.

In 2021, she won Grammys for Best Rap Performance and Best Rap Song for "Savage (Remix)". She also won Best New Artist.

Megan Thee Stallion was nominated for Best Female Hip-Hop Artist at the BET Awards in both 2019 and 2020, winning the latter. She additionally has been nominated for Best New Hip Hop Artist at the 2019 BET Hip Hop Awards, Top Rap Female Artist at the 2020 Billboard Music Awards, Best New Hip-Hop Artist at the 2020 iHeartRadio Music Awards and Artist of the Year at the 2020 MTV Video Music Awards. She has also received the Marketing Genius award at the 2020 Libera Awards and the Powerhouse Award at the 2019 Billboard Women in Music awards.

Awards and nominations

Notes

References

External links 
  

Awards and nominations
Megan Thee Stallion